is a railway station in the city of Ashikaga, Tochigi, Japan, operated by the private railway operator Tōbu Railway.

Lines

Station layout

This station has a single island platform, connected to the station building by a footbridge.

Platforms

Adjacent stations

History
Agata Station opened on 1 May 1928.

From 17 March 2012, station numbering was introduced on all Tobu lines, with Agata Station becoming "TI-12".

Passenger statistics
In fiscal 2019, the station was used by an average of 617 passengers daily (boarding passengers only).

Surrounding area
 Ashikaga Minami High School
 Ashikaga-Tsukuba Post Office

See also
 List of railway stations in Japan

References

External links

 Agata Station information (Tobu) 

Railway stations in Tochigi Prefecture
Tobu Isesaki Line
Stations of Tobu Railway
Railway stations in Japan opened in 1928
Ashikaga, Tochigi